Caitlin Milazzo is a British academic at the University of Nottingham. She also writes for The Guardian.

Career 
Milazzo wrote a book about the UK Independence Party, and the impact on British politics with Matthew Goodwin.

Bibliography 

 UKIP: Inside the Campaign to Redraw the Map of British Politics, 2014

References

External links 
 Official website
 Caitlin Milazzo at Amazon books
 Caitlin Milazzo at Google Scholar
 Caitlin Milazzo at The Guardian

Living people
21st-century British women writers
Academics of the University of Nottingham
Year of birth missing (living people)